Emma Maltais is a Canadian ice hockey forward, currently playing for the Ohio State Buckeyes of the NCAA Division I.

Career 
Growing up in southern Ontario, Maltais began skating at the age of 2 and began playing hockey at the age of 4. During high school, she played for the Oakville Hornets in the Provincial Women's Hockey League (PWHL), where she served as team captain in the 2016–17 season and set a team record for career points with 147.

In 2017, she began attending Ohio State University, playing for the university's women's ice hockey programme. She scored 40 points in 37 games during her rookie NCAA season, leading the WCHA in points-per-game and breaking the record for most WCHA Rookie of the Month awards, winning three times. Her production increased to 43 points in 35 games the following season, again leading Ohio State in scoring and being named to the All-WCHA First Team. In the 2019–20 season, she set an Ohio State record for points, with 59 points in 38 games, and picking up her 100th collegiate point against Bemidji State University on November 2, 2019. That year, she was a top-10 finalist for the Patty Kazmaier Memorial Award and was named to the All-WCHA First Team for the third consecutive season.

International career 
Maltais represented Canada at the 2016 and 2017 IIHF World Women's U18 Championship, scoring a total of nine points in ten games and winning silver twice.

She was named to the senior national team roster for the first time in 2019, suiting up for the 2019-20 Rivalry Series against the United States. In May 2021, she was one of 28 players invited to Hockey Canada's Centralization Camp, which represents the selection process for the Canadian women's team that shall compete in Ice hockey at the 2022 Winter Olympics.

On January 11, 2022, Maltais was named to Canada's 2022 Olympic team.

Personal life 
Maltais studies health sciences at Ohio State University and has interned at the Ohio State Neurological Institute.

Awards and honours
2019-20 CCM Hockey Women's Division I All-American: Second Team

References

External links

1999 births
Living people
Franco-Ontarian people
Canadian women's ice hockey forwards
Ice hockey people from Ontario
Ohio State Buckeyes women's ice hockey players
Canadian expatriate ice hockey players in the United States
Sportspeople from Burlington, Ontario
Ice hockey players at the 2022 Winter Olympics
Olympic ice hockey players of Canada
Medalists at the 2022 Winter Olympics
Olympic gold medalists for Canada
Olympic medalists in ice hockey